The Korean Christian Church in Japan was founded in 1909 by Presbyterian missionaries from Korea. Pastor Han Sok-Po evangelized primarily among Korean students in Tokyo. From 1915 the Korean Presbyterians send more missionaries and the church in Japan grew steadily. Congregations are in all parts of Japan. In 1934 the Korean Church in Japan was established, but in 1939 it was forced to become a part of the Church of Christ in Japan. After World War II it separated and held a General Assembly of the Korean Christian Church in Japan. The Apostles Creed and Westminster Confession of Faith are the official documents. Partner churches are the Presbyterian Church in Canada and the Presbyterian Church in Korea.

The denomination has 100 congregations and 7,200 members served by 116 pastors. It is a member of the World Communion of Reformed Churches.

References

External links 
 
 

Members of the World Communion of Reformed Churches
Reformed denominations in Japan
Christian organizations established in 1909
Zainichi Korean culture